In the clear may refer to:
 Plaintext, unencrypted information
 "In the Clear", a song by Foo Fighters from Sonic Highways
 In the Clear, an album by Ivy
 "In The Clear", a song by Cap'n Jazz from Shmap'n Shmazz